Austrobuxus cracens is a species of plant in the Picrodendraceae family. It is endemic to New Caledonia.

References

Picrodendraceae
Endemic flora of New Caledonia
Vulnerable plants
Taxonomy articles created by Polbot